Berlin is both a city and one of Germany’s federated states (city state). Since the 2001 administrative reform, it has been made up of twelve districts, each with its own administrative body. However, unlike the municipalities and counties of other German states, the Berlin districts are not territorial corporations of public law with autonomous competencies and property, but simple administrative agencies of Berlin's state and city government, the City of Berlin forming a single municipality since the Greater Berlin Act of 1920. Thus they cannot be equated to US or UK boroughs in the traditional meaning of the term.

Each district possesses a district representatives' assembly directly elected by proportional representation and an administrative body called district board. The district board, comprising since October 2021 six (until then five) members - a district mayor as head and five (earlier four) district councillors - is elected by the district representatives' assembly, proportionally reflecting its party composition according to popular vote. The district board is in charge of most local administrative matters directly relevant to local citizens; however, all of its decisions can at any moment be revoked by the Berlin Senate. Furthermore, the districts are financially completely dependent on state donations, as they neither possess any taxation power nor own any property. The district mayors form a council of mayors (led by the city's governing mayor), which advises the Senate.

History

Each borough is made up of several officially recognized subdistricts or neighborhoods ( in German, sometimes called quarters in English). The exact amount of neighborhoods that form a borough varies considerably, ranging from two (Friedrichshain-Kreuzberg) to fifteen (Treptow-Köpenick). These neighborhoods typically have a historical identity as former independent cities, villages, or rural municipalities that were united in 1920 as part of the Greater Berlin Act, forming the basis for the present-day city and state. The neighborhoods do not have their own governmental bodies but are recognized by the city and the boroughs for planning and statistical purposes. Berliners often identify more with the neighborhood where they live than with the borough that governs them. The neighborhoods are further subdivided into statistical tracts, which are mainly used for planning and statistical purposes. The statistical tracts correspond roughly but not exactly with neighborhoods recognized by residents.

When Greater Berlin was established in 1920, the city was organized into twenty boroughs, most of which were named after their largest component neighborhood, often a former city or municipality; others, such as Kreuzberg and Prenzlauer Berg, were named for geographic features.

After World War II, Berlin was divided into four sectors, with the Western sectors controlled by the United States, Britain, and France, and the Eastern sector controlled by the Soviet Union.

In 1961, the Soviet Union built the Berlin Wall to divide the city, effectively separating West Berlin from East Berlin and the rest of East Germany. The Wall became a symbol of the Cold War and remained in place until 1989.
In 1989, the Berlin Wall fell, and the city was reunified. This marked the end of the Cold War and the beginning of a new era in Berlin's history.

After reunification, Berlin underwent a process of rapid transformation, as the city worked to rebuild and modernize its infrastructure and economy. Many new businesses and cultural institutions were established, and the city became a center of creativity and innovation.

By 2000, Berlin comprised twenty-three boroughs, as three new boroughs had been created in East Berlin. Today Berlin is divided into twelve boroughs, reduced from twenty-three boroughs before Berlin's 2001 administrative reform.

Boroughs
An administrative reform in 2001 merged all but three of the existing boroughs into the current 12 boroughs, as listed below. The three boroughs that were not affected were Spandau, Reinickendorf and Neukölln, as the population of each was already exceeding 200,000.

Administration
The borough government is part of the two-stage administration of the Berlin city-state, whereby the Senate and its affiliated agencies, institutions, and municipal enterprises form the first stage of the so-called  (central administration). On the second position, the boroughs enjoy a certain grade of autonomy—though in no way comparable to the German  districts or independent cities, nor even to the local government of a common municipality as a legal entity, as according to the Berlin Constitution the legal status of the city as a German state itself is that of a unified municipality. The power of the borough governments is limited and their performance of assigned tasks is subject to regulatory supervision by the Senate.

Nevertheless, the twelve self-governing boroughs have constitutional status and are themselves subdivided into two administrative bodies: each is governed by the borough assembly (BVV) and a full-time borough council, consisting of four councilors and headed by a borough mayor. The BVV assembly is directly elected by the borough's population and therefore acts as a borough parliament, though it is officially part of the executive. It elects the members of the borough council, checks its daily administration, and is able to make applications and recommendations. The twelve borough mayors regularly meet in the Council of Mayors, led by the city's Governing Mayor; the council answers to and advises the Senate.

Coats of arms

All the coats of arms of Berliner boroughs (the current as of the ones in the period 1990 to 2001) have some common points: The shield has a Spanish form and the coronet is represented by a mural crown: 3 towers in red bricks with the coat of arms of Berlin in the middle.

Most of the coats of arms of current boroughs  have changed some elements in their field: Some of them have created a "fusion" of themes of the merged  (Charlottenburg-Wilmersdorf, Lichtenberg, Steglitz-Zehlendorf, Tempelhof-Schöneberg); others have modified their themes taken from one of the two (or more) former merged boroughs (Friedrichshain-Kreuzberg, Marzahn-Hellersdorf, Mitte and Treptow-Köpenick). Only the unchanged boroughs of Neukölln, Reinickendorf and Spandau haven't changed their field. The coat of arms of Pankow was created with a new design in 2008, having been the only district without an emblem for 7 years.

Localities
As of 2012, the twelve boroughs are made up of a total of 97 officially recognized localities. Almost all of them are further subdivided into several other zones (defined in German as  etc.). The largest  is Köpenick, the smallest one is Hansaviertel. The most populated is Neukölln (154,127 inhabitants in 2009), the least populated is Malchow (450 inhabitants in 2008).

The coats of arms of the Localitys lost their validity with the incorporation into Greater Berlin/in new districts and thus disappeared from official use. The coats of arms listed here are the historically used signs.

(01) Mitte

(02) Friedrichshain-Kreuzberg

(03) Pankow

(04) Charlottenburg-Wilmersdorf

(05) Spandau

(06) Steglitz-Zehlendorf

(07) Tempelhof-Schöneberg

(08) Neukölln

(09) Treptow-Köpenick

(10) Marzahn-Hellersdorf

(11) Lichtenberg

 Codes 1105 and 1108 (this one to former Hohenschönhausen locality) are not assigned

(12) Reinickendorf

See also

 Politics of Berlin
 Berlin Police

References

External links

 
 
 
Berlin
Geography of Berlin
Boroughs and localities